The 35th Sports Emmy Awards was presented on May 6, 2014 at the Frederick P. Rose Hall at the Jazz at Lincoln Center in New York City. Ted Turner, entrepreneur, sportsman and television visionary, was honored with the Lifetime Achievement Award for Sports.

Awards

Programs
{|class=wikitable
|-
!style="width:50%"|Outstanding Live Sports Special
!style="width:50%"|Outstanding Live Sports Series
|-
|valign="top"|
 The 109th World Series, FOX 2013 NBA Finals, ABC/ESPN
 2013 Wimbledon Championships, ABC/ESPN
 The 55th Daytona 500, FOX
 Red Sox vs. Cardinals
 34th America's Cup, NBCSN
|valign="top"|
 Sunday Night Football, NBC ESPN College Football, ABC/ESPN
 ESPN Monday Night Football, ESPN
 HBO Boxing, HBO
 SEC on CBS, CBS
|-
!style="width:50%"|Outstanding Edited Sports Event Coverage
!style="width:50%"|Outstanding Playoff Coverage
|-
|valign="top"|
 All Access, Showtime, Episode: Mayweather vs. Canelo Epilogue 2013 Ironman World Championship, NBC
 Keep Climbing: The 2013 Elite 11, ESPNU
 NFL Turning Point, NBCSN
 Super Bowl XLVII, NFL Network
|valign="top"|
 American League Championship Series, FOX, Red Sox vs. Tigers MLB Postseason on tbs, tbs
 NBA Playoffs on TNT, TNT
 NFC Championships, FOX, Falcons vs. 49ers
 NFC Wild Card, FOX, Seahawks vs. Redskins
|-
!style="width:50%"|Outstanding Sports Documentary
!style="width:50%"|Outstanding Sports Documentary Series
|-
|valign="top"|
 The Doctor, NBA TV First: The Official Film of the London Olympic Games, NBC
 LT: The Life and Times, Showtime
 UFC Presents Ronda Rousey: Breaking Ground, FS1
|valign="top"|
 30 for 30, ESPN [ESPN Films]
 24/7 – Red Wings - Maple Leafs: Road to the Winter Classic, HBO
 A Football Life, NFL Network
 Casualties of the Gridion, Conde Nast Entertainment
 The Journey – Big Ten Basketball 2013, Big Ten Network
 MLS Insider, NBCSN
 Nine for XI, ESPN
|-
!style="width:50%"|Outstanding Studio Show - Weekly
!style="width:50%"|Outstanding Studio Show - Daily
|-
|valign="top"|
 College GameDay - Football, ESPN Inside the NBA on TNT, TNT FOX NFL Sunday, FOX
 Monday Night Countdown, ESPN
 NFL GameDay Morning, NFL Network
|valign="top"|
 Inside the NBA on TNT: Playoffs, TNT MLB Tonight, MLB Network
 Olbermann
 Pardon the Interruption, ESPN
 SportsCenter, ESPN
|-
!style="width:50%"|Outstanding Edited Sports Series/Anthology
!style="width:50%"|Outstanding Sports Journalism
|-
|valign="top"|
 Real Sports with Bryant Gumbel, HBO 60 Minutes Sports, Showtime
 E:60, ESPN2
 NFL Films Presents, NFL Films
|valign="top"|
 E:60 - Children of the Ring, ESPN2 60 Minutes Sports - The Fall of Lance Armstrong, Showtime
 In Play with Jimmy Roberts - Valentino Dixon, Golf Channel
 Real Sports with Bryant Gumbel - Putin's Olympics: Cronyism and Corruption in Russia, HBO
|-
!style="width:50%"|Outstanding Short Feature
!style="width:50%"|Outstanding Long Feature
|-
|valign="top"|
 SportsCenter - Richie Parker: Drive, ESPN E:60 - Shear Will, ESPN2
 Ironman World Championship - Peace, Love, Grace, NBC
 Sunday NFL Countdown - O.J. Brigance: Heart of the Ravens, ESPN
 The Super Bowl Today - Chuck Pagano: A Season of Family, CBS
|valign="top"|
 60 Minutes Sports - Great Falls, Showtime 30 for 30 Shorts - The Irrelevant Giant, Grantland.com
 30 for 40 Shorts - Cutthroat, Grantland.com
 SportsCenter - The Lady Jags: Losing to Win, ESPN
 SportsCenter - Carry On, ESPN
|-
!style="width:50%"|Outstanding Open/Tease
!style="width:50%"|Outstanding New Approaches - Sports Event Coverage
|-
|valign="top"|
 Super Bowl XLVII - We Will Rock You Remix, CBS 2013 Open Championship - Fish on Tartan, ESPN
 24/7 - Red Wings - Maple Leafs: Road to the Winter Classic, HBO
 MLB Network Divisional Playoffs - A Field of Dreamers, MLB Network
|valign="top"|
 The 34th America's Cup - Official App, America's Cup Event Authority 2013 NCAA March Madness Live, NCAA
 NFL Sunday Ticket Experience on DirecTV, DirecTV
 The PGA Tour Experience on DirecTV, DirecTV
|-
!style="width:50%"|Outstanding New Approaches - Sports Programming
!style="width:50%"|Outstanding New Approaches - Sports Programming Short Format
|-
|valign="top"|
 Sports Illustrated - A Boy Helps a Town Heal, SI.com Behind the Mask, Hulu
 FOX Sports Live - Social Highlight, FS1
 Nine for IX - Coach, espnw.com
 Together We Make Football - The Contest, NFL Films
 Underdogs, SI.com
|valign="top"|
 JFK: The Untold NFL History of That Day in Dallas, NFL.com, [NFL Digital Media] NFL UP!, NFL.com, [NFL Ditigal Media] Collegeinsider.com All-Access - Anatomy of a Game Winner - The 2013 CIT Final, collegeinsider.com
 NFL Films Drawn - Between Takes with Wynton Marsalis, NFL.com
 Numbers Never Lie Whiteboard - LeBron James can Surpass Michael Jordan, ESPN2
|-
!style="width:50%"|Outstanding Sports Promotional Announcement - Institutional
!style="width:50%"|Outstanding Sports Promotional Announcement - Episodic
|-
|valign="top"|
 NFL Draft - Leon Sandcastle, NFL Network Formula 1 - Rockstar/Shaken and Stirred vs. Drivers/Austin, NBC/NBCSN
 HBO Boxing - Fall Boxing Image, HBO
 MLB Network Prime Time Line Up - Here's to Us, MLB Network
 NBA Playoffs - will.i.am Playoff Promo, ESPN
 NFL Draft - Leon Sandcastle, NFL Network
|valign="top"|
 NHL on NBCSN - Wednesday Night Rivalry, NBCSN 24/7 – Red Wings - Maple Leafs: Road to the Winter Classic, HBO
 A Football Life - Life Story, NFL Network
 NASCAR on FOX - NASCAR DOG FIGHT, FOX/FOX SOCCER/FUEL
|-
!style="width:50%"|Outstanding Live Sports Coverage in Spanish
!style="width:50%"|Outstanding Studio Show in Spanish
|-
|valign="top"|
 Rumbo Al Mundial - Costa Rica vs. Mexico, Telemundo Futebol Estelar - La Gran Finale: Leon vs. America, Telemundo
 Futebol Estelar - Super Clasico: Guadalajara vs. America, Telemundo
 Liga MX Clausura 2013 season – Final - 2nd Leg America vs. Cruz Azul, UNIVISION
|valign="top"|
 Nacion, ESPN Deportes SportsCenter, ESPN Deportes Futbol Picante, ESPN Deportes
 Lakers en Vivo, Time Warner Cable Deportes
 Titulares Telemundo, Telemundo
|}

Technical
{|class=wikitable
|-
!style="width:50%"|Outstanding Technical Team Remote
!style="width:50%"|Outstanding Technical Team Studio
|-
|valign="top"|
 NASCAR on FOX, FOX ESPN Monday Night Football, ESPN
 Golf Channel on NBC, NBC/Golf Channel
 MLB on FOX, FOX
 The 34th America's Cup, NBCSN
|valign="top"|
 MLB Tonight, MLB Network College GameDay, ESPN
 Road to the Final Four, CBS/TNT/tbs/TruTV
 The Premier League, NBCSN
|-
!style="width:50%"|Outstanding Camera Work
!style="width:50%"|Outstanding Editing
|-
|valign="top"|
 24/7 – Red Wings - Maple Leafs: Road to the Winter Classic, HBO E:60 - Children of the Ring, ESPN2
 FOX Sports Live - West, TX, FS1
 NFL Films Presents, NFL Network
 2013 Tour de France, NBCSN
|valign="top"|
 Hard Knocks - Training Camp with the Cincinnati Bengals, HBO 2013 PGA Tour - Teases, Golf Channel
 24/7 - Pacqiau-Rios, HBO
 Legendary Nights - The Tale of Gatti-Ward, HBO
 NBA on TNT - Teases, TNT
|-
!style="width:50%"|The Dick Schaap Outstanding Writing Award
!style="width:50%"|Outstanding Music Compisition/Direction/Lyrics
|-
|valign="top"|
 NFL Films Presents - Yours Truly, Dr. Z, NFL Network, [NFL Films] 24/7 – Red Wings - Maple Leafs: Road to the Winter Classic, HBO
 E:60 - The Ballad of Bushwacker, ESPN2
 ESPN Grand Slam Tennis - Wimbledon & US Open, ABC/ESPN
 Football Night in America - Redskins Name Commentary, NBC
|valign="top"|
 Hard Knocks - Training Camp with the Cincinnati Bengals, HBO, [NFL Films] Against the Tide, Showtime
 College Football on CBS - The Army-Navy Game, CBS
 Nine for IX - The Diplomat, ESPN
 Road to the Super Bowl, NFL Network
|-
!style="width:50%"|Outstanding Live Event Audio/Sound
!style="width:50%"|Outstanding Post-Produced Audio/Sound
|-
|valign="top"|
 MLB on FOX, FOX NASCAR on ESPN, ABC/ESPN
 NASCAR on FOX, FOX
 The 34th America's Cup, NBCSN
|valign="top"|
 Hard Knocks - Training Camp with the Cincinnati Bengals, HBO [NFL Films] 24/7 – Red Wings vs. Maple Leafs: Road to the Winter Classic, HBO
 ESPN Sport Science, ESPN
 Sound FX, NFL Films
 Super Bowl XLVII, NFL Films
|-
!style="width:50%"|Outstanding Live Event Graphic Design
!style="width:50%"|Outstanding Post-Produced Graphic Design
|-
|valign="top"|
 X Games, ESPN ESPN Monday Night Football, ESPN
 Intentional Talk, MLB Network
 NBA on TNT, TNT
 NBA on TNT - All-Star Weekend, TNT
|valign="top"|
 MLB Tonight, MLB Network 2013 Heisman Trophy Presentation, ESPN
 E:60, ESPN2
 ESPN Sport Science, ESPN
 The NFL Today, CBS
|-
!style="width:50%"|Outstanding Studio Design/Art Direction
!style="width:50%"|Outstanding Production Design/Art Direction
|-
|valign="top"|
 NBA Playoffs on TNT, TNT MLB Postseason on tbs, tbs
 Super Bowl XLVII, SBC/SBC Sports Network
|valign="top"|
 Sunday Night Football - Waiting All Day for Sunday Night Opening, NBC NASCAR on FOX - Hangar Shoot, FOX
 NFL Draft, ESPN
 The Division Series On MLB Network - A Field on Network, MLB Network
|-
!style="width:50%"|The George Wensel Technical Achievement Award
|style="background:#FFF; border-bottom:1px solid #FFF; border-right:1px solid #FFF"|
|-
|valign="top"|
 The Premier League - Goal-line technology, NBCSN NASCAR on FOX and SPEED, FOX/SPEED
 NASCAR - Gyrocam, NASCAR
 Pac-12 Networks, PAC-12 Network
 Multicam, MI/O
 The 34th America's Cup – AC LOVELINE - "WINGWASH", MLB Network
|style="background:#FFF; border-top:1px solid #FFF; border-bottom:1px solid #FFF; border-right:1px solid #FFF"|
|}

Personalities
{|class=wikitable
|-
!style="width:50%"|Outstanding Sports Personality - Studio Host
!style="width:50%"|Outstanding Sports Personality - Play-by-Play
|-
|valign="top"|
 Bob Costas, NBC/MLB Network James Brown
 Dave Faherty, Golf Channel
 Greg Gumbel, CBS
 Dan Patrick, NBC/NBCSN/DirecTV
|valign="top"|
 Mike Emrick, NBC/NBCSN Marv Albert, TNT/tbs/TruTV/CBS
 Mike Breen, ABC/ESPN
 Joe Buck, FOX
 Bob Costas, NBC/NBCSN
|-
!style="width:50%"|Outstanding Sports Personality - Studio Analyst
!style="width:50%"|Outstanding Sports Personality - Sports Event Analyst
|-
|valign="top"|
 Harold Reynolds, MLB Network/FOX Tom Verducci, tbs/MLB Network Cris Collinsworth, Showtime
 Al Leiter, MLB Network
 Rick Neuheisel PAC-12 Network
 Michael Strahan, FOX
|valign="top"|
 Cris Collinsworth, NBC Gary Danielson, CBS
 Kirk Herbstreit, ESPN
 Tim McCarver, FOX
|-
!style="width:50%"|Outstanding Sports Personality - Sports Reporter
!style="width:50%"|Outstanding On-Air Sports Personality in Spanish
|-
|valign="top"|
 Michele Tafoya, NBC Pierre McGuire, NBC/NBCSN
 Ken Rosenthal, FOX
 Lisa Salters, ESPN
 Tom Verducci, MLB Network
|valign="top"|
 Andres Cantor, Telemundo Lindsay Casinelli, Univision
 Jose Ramon Fernandez, ESPN Deportes
 Ivan Kasanzew, Univision
 Sammy Sadovnik, Telemundo
|}

Lifetime Achievement Award
 Ted Turner

Awards by Network Group

References

 033
Sports Emmy Awards
Emmy Awards
2014 in New York City
May 2014 sports events in the United States